Otter Creek is a creek in the Moira River and Lake Ontario drainage basins in Tweed, Hastings County, Addington Highlands, Lennox and Addington County and Central Frontenac, Frontenac County in Ontario, Canada.

See also
List of rivers of Ontario

References

Rivers of Frontenac County
Rivers of Hastings County
Rivers of Lennox and Addington County